The 1914 Arizona gubernatorial election took place on November 3, 1914, for the post of the Governor of Arizona. The Supreme Court of Arizona ruled that there would be no statewide elections in 1912, thus extending the terms to sync up with elections on even years. The Democratic nominee was incumbent governor George W. P. Hunt, his Republican opponent was the final Delegate to Congress from Arizona Territory, Ralph H. Cameron. Cameron was disadvantaged  by the same reason the previous Republican nominee Wells was: he had opposed statehood with the present Constitution.

Two third parties also made strong challenges, the Progressives polled over 10% with nominee George Young, the final Territorial Secretary and then-mayor of Phoenix. The Socialists held around the same percentage of votes as in 1911, increasing slightly, but would peak here and never reach the same height.

George W. P. Hunt was sworn in again as governor on January 4, 1915.

Democratic primary

Candidates
George W. P. Hunt, incumbent governor
Henry A. Hughes, physician and former Democratic primary candidate for governor.

Race
As of May 1914, Hunt had still not officially declared his intention to run for re-election. By that point in time, there were already two other Democrats who had announced their intention to run for the Democratic nomination: Fred Sutter and Henry A. Hughes. Sutter had been the Superior Court Judge from Cochise County from 1912 until his resignation in July 1913. When he resigned, he had stated his intention to never run for elected office again. However, in February 1914, when Democratic leaders began to float his name as a possible candidate in the Democratic primary for the governor's seat, he did not disavow those rumors. By March it was reported that he would be the conservative Democratic candidate in the primary, to oppose the more liberal Hunt, and he officially announced his candidacy by mid-March. Within a month, Sutter was considered the front runner for the nomination, over the incumbent Hunt. There were rumors that Hunt would seek the U.S. Senate seat, rather than another term as governor. Sutter's official announcement that he was a candidate for governor came on May 22 in Tucson. In order not to splinter the party, Sutter withdrew from the race in early July, announcing his support for Hunt. When Hunt officially began his candidacy for re-election in mid-July, with the submission of a petition to put his name on the ballot, the first signature on the petition was that of Sutter.

Results

General election

Results

References

Bibliography

1914
Arizona
Gubernatorial
November 1914 events